Melodifestivalen is an event organised by Swedish public broadcasters Sveriges Television (SVT) and Sveriges Radio (SR) to determine the country's representative at the Eurovision Song Contest. The Swedish broadcasters have experimented with techniques including splitting the juries by age, regional voting, and using an "expert" jury. Televoting was controversially first introduced in 1993, as an unannounced experiment. The Swedish telephone network promptly collapsed under the strain of phone calls being made.

Televoting was permanently reintroduced in 1999, but the regional jury system was retained, and given a 50% weighting in the overall results. In 2011, the regional juries were abolished and their task was given to juries from other countries that participate in the year's Eurovision Song Contest. 2015 saw the introduction of a mobile app that allowed the public to vote for their favourite entries for free. The current voting system has been the subject of controversy on several occasions, as it is possible for the song which receives the most votes from the public not to win, as happened in 2005, 2008, 2013, 2017 and 2022.

The current televoting and app-voting record is 23,521,188 votes in the Melodifestivalen 2023 final.

Summary of voting systems used

Records

In the event of a tie, the song that received more votes from the public receives the higher position. The closest victories are Tommy Körberg's in 1969 and Björn Skifs' in 1978. In 1969, Körberg tied for first place with Jan Malmsjö before winning after the jury voted for their favourite out of the two. In 1978, Björn Skifs tied for first place with Lasse Holm, Kikki Danielsson and Wizex; but won after each jury was called to vote for their favourite out of the tied songs. Unlike in 1969, each jury group (rather than individual jury members) counted for one point in the tie-break.

Since the current voting system was introduced, results have been more clear-cut. The televoters and juries agreed on the winner in seven out of nine finals between 1999 and 2007. The closest victory since 2014 is The Mamas' one-point win in 2020. The biggest victory by straight-points in the history of the event is ABBA's win in 1974 with 302 points. Under the current voting system the record is 288 points, achieved by Måns Zelmerlöw in 2015 with the song "Heroes". The entry also broke the record for the biggest difference between the winning and second placed song, with 149 points between it and Jon Henrik Fjällgren's "Jag är fri (Manne leam frijje)". "Heroes" also garnered the largest amount of both jury and viewer points received by an entry since 1999, gathering 122 points and 166 points, respectively. Two songs have scored top marks from each voting region: Carola Häggkvist in 1983 with "Främling", and Arvingarna in 1993 with "Eloise". However, in 1993, experimental televoting was used and the two are not entirely comparable. The biggest victory in terms of points as a percentage of the total possible score is also held by Carola and "Främling", which defeated Kikki Danielsson's "Varför är kärleken röd?" by 43 points, 48% of the total potential mark.

Jury regions

Until 2010, each jury represented one of SVT's news districts. In 2010, six juries were replaced by international juries from different European countries, with the remaining juries coming from Luleå, Umeå, Gothenburg, Malmö and Stockholm. In 2011, the regional juries were all replaced by international juries. In 2013 and 2014, all countries of the "Big Five" in Eurovision cast their votes.

Swedish juries

International juries

References

V
Voting